The following are all the albums and singles released by the Lighthouse Family.

Albums

Studio albums

Compilation albums

Remix albums

Singles

Notes

References

Pop music group discographies
Rhythm and blues discographies
Discographies of British artists